Bolesław Skarżyński (31 March 1901, in Warsaw – 17 March 1963, in Kraków) was a renowned Polish biochemist.

References 
 Profile at the Polish Academy of Sciences website

Polish biochemists
20th-century Polish physicists
1901 births
1963 deaths
Scientists from Warsaw
Jagiellonian University alumni
Academic staff of Jagiellonian University
Recipients of the Order of Polonia Restituta
Polish United Workers' Party members